The William Bonner House is a historic residence in Midway, Utah, United States, that is listed on the National Register of Historic Places.

Description
The house is located at 110 East Main Street (SR-113). It was designed and built by John Watkins.

It was listed on the National Register of Historic Places June 17, 1986.

See also

 National Register of Historic Places listings in Wasatch County, Utah
 George Bonner Jr. House
 George Bonner Sr. House

References

External links

Houses in Wasatch County, Utah
Gothic Revival architecture in Utah
Houses on the National Register of Historic Places in Utah
National Register of Historic Places in Wasatch County, Utah